Hilary Bok (born 1959) is the Henry R. Luce Professor of Bioethics and Moral & Political Theory at the Johns Hopkins University. Bok received a B.A. in philosophy from Princeton University in 1981 and her Ph.D. from Harvard University in 1991.

Family
Her parents are the well-known academics Derek Bok and Sissela Bok and her maternal grandparents were the Swedish economist Gunnar Myrdal and the politician and diplomat Alva Myrdal, both Nobel laureates. Her paternal grandparents were distinguished Pennsylvania jurist Curtis Bok and Margaret Plummer Bok.

Career
She served as associate professor of philosophy at Pomona College from 1997 to 2000. Bok was also a Laurance S. Rockefeller Visiting Fellow at the Princeton University Center for Human Values from 1994 to 1995. Her areas of specialization are bioethics, moral philosophy, free will, and the works of Immanuel Kant. She is a faculty member of the Berman Institute of Bioethics. Bok is the author of Freedom and Responsibility (1998), a Kantian critique of libertarian theories of free will. More recently, she has written extensively about stem cell research, most notably in The Lancet.

Blogging
Bok blogged until 2009 under the pseudonym "hilzoy" at the well-known blogs Obsidian Wings and "Political Animal" (the blog of The Washington Monthly magazine).

References

External links

 Bok's page at Johns Hopkins University
 Princeton University Press page on Freedom and Responsibility
 Bok's page at Berman Institute of Bioethics
 "Justice, ethnicity, and stem-cell banks" co-written with Kathryn Schill and Ruth Faden, The Lancet, July 10, 2004, v364 i9429 p118 retrieved 17 December 2005
 

1959 births
Living people
21st-century American philosophers
20th-century American philosophers
American women philosophers
Harvard Graduate School of Arts and Sciences alumni
Johns Hopkins University faculty
Princeton University alumni
American people of Swedish descent
American women bloggers
American bloggers
20th-century American women writers
21st-century American women writers
Kant scholars
Bioethicists
Pomona College faculty
American women non-fiction writers
21st-century American non-fiction writers
American people of Dutch descent